To Each His Own is a 1946 American drama romance film directed by Mitchell Leisen and starring Olivia de Havilland. The screenplay was written by Charles Brackett and Jacques Théry. A young woman bears a child out of wedlock and has to give him up.

De Havilland won the Academy Award for Best Actress. Brackett was nominated for Best Writing, Original Story. The title song became a hit.

Plot

In World War II London, fire wardens Josephine "Jody" Norris and Lord Desham keep a lonely vigil. When Jody saves Desham's life, they become better acquainted. They bond over being cold, lonely middle-aged people, and he recounts his life story and coaxes her to reveal hers in turn. She is reluctant to, but agrees to go to dinner with him. While Desham is arranging dinner plans, a man from her hometown turns up and tells her that someone from their town is arriving at the train station. Overjoyed, Jody rushes to the station, leaving a bewildered Desham behind. While there, she runs into a young woman who is waiting for her pilot beau, which sends Jody into a flashback that ends once the train arrives.

Jody is the belle of her small American hometown of Piersen Falls. Both Alec Piersen and traveling salesman Mac Tilton propose to her, but she turns them both down. A disappointed Alec marries Corinne, his second choice. When handsome US Army Air Service fighter pilot Captain Bart Cosgrove flies in to promote a World War I bond drive, he and Jody quickly fall in love, though they have only one night together.

Later, a pregnant Jody is secretly visiting a doctor in New York, and is advised that her life is in danger and she needs an operation. She agrees, though she would lose her unborn child. When she learns that Bart has been killed in action, she changes her mind. She secretly gives birth to their son in 1919. She tries to arrange it so that she can "adopt" the boy without scandal by having him left on the doorstep of a family with too many children already, but the scheme backfires. Corinne loses her own newborn that same day, but is consoled by Jody's. Jody has to love her son, named Gregory or "Griggsy," from afar.

Jody's father dies, forcing her to sell the family drug store. When Jody asks to become Griggsy's live-in nurse, Corinne turns her down. Agitated, Jody reveals she is Griggsy's mother and brandishes his birth certificate. Corinne then tells her that she has suspected all along that Jody is the baby's mother, and that he has been adopted; Jody has no claim on him. Knowing that her husband never loved her, Corinne is determined to keep the one person who does.

Jody moves to New York City to work for Mac. She discovers to her surprise that he is a bootlegger, using a cosmetics business as a front. The same day, the place is raided by the police, leaving Mac with nothing but the cosmetics equipment. Jody persuades him to make cold cream; with her drive and determination, she builds up a thriving business, and they become rich.

In 1924, she forces Corinne to give her Griggsy by threatening to block a desperately needed bank loan for Alec's failing business, which she has been secretly financially supporting for the past few years. After two months, however, Jody has still not revealed her identity to Griggsy, and the boy is still miserably homesick. When she attempts to tell him that she is his mother, Griggsy begins crying at the mention of his adoption, which he says Corinne has already discussed with him, and runs off. Jody gives up and sends him back to Corinne and Alec.

Heartbroken, Jody leaves the US to immerse herself in work, setting up and running the English branch of her Lady Vyvyan Cosmetics Company. During World War II, her son becomes a pilot in the 8th Air Force. When he gets a leave in London, Jody meets his train and fusses over him, arranging for him and his WREN fiancée, Liz, the young woman she bumped into, to stay at her apartment and go out on the town. He only knows her as a family friend, and does not think it particularly unusual when he discovers a scrapbook in her apartment filled with his baby photos. Griggsy tells Jody that he and Liz have been struggling to get married all day, as England requires a 15-day delay. He then mentions that because they cannot be married, he will end his leave early.

Lord Desham, who is attracted to Jody, arrives at her apartment and finds her despondent over the fact that Griggsy will not be staying the week in London. She also lets out that she is Griggsy's mother, and Desham understands that this is her sad past she was unwilling to talk about earlier. Using his influence, Desham arranges for the young man to marry his fiancée without the customary delay. After some broad hints from Desham, and further musing from his new wife, Lieutenant Piersen finally realizes why Jody has been so helpful and asks his mother, by that title, for a dance.

Cast

Home media

Adaptation
The film inspired the Indian writer Sachin Bhowmick to work on a script thematically similar to ''To Each His Own '' later on it was filmed as Aradhana (1969) and went to become one of the most successful films in Hindi cinema, The film is considered as milestone in Rajesh Khanna's career. The film was remade in Turkish as Kadın Asla Unutmaz also, directed by Orhan Aksoy which released in same year.

Aradhana was remade in Telugu as Kannavari Kalalu and in Tamil as Sivagamiyin Selvan.

Critical reception

Alt Film Guide said "To Each His Own is surprisingly direct in its handling of an unwed mother, paralleling Jody's increasing coldness with the detached—but honest—flashbacks that comprise the bulk of the film." One reviewer at Cinescene said "In To Each His Own, the sufferer is able to learn something from her mistakes and misfortunes, growing past her grief and distress into a kind of wisdom. The picture has style, but also a sincerity of sentiment that gives it distinction." Another wrote, "Forthrightly feminist avant la lettre, the film is conscious of constraints, but committed to its movement forward: less resentful than resourceful, and more stalwart than strident, yet angry and determined nonetheless."

ClassicFilmGuide deemed it "A marvelous sentimental (and now dated) story ". JigsawLounge wrote "Brackett's screenplay is a wonder of intricate construction, with pretty much every minor detail of character and plot introduced for a reason which 'pays off' much later in the script. On sober reflection, it is a rather tall tale—and more than the usual degree of disbelief-suspension may be required here and there. But this should prove a very simple task for all but the most hard-headed of audiences: To Each His Own'''s combination of emotional resonance and a lively wit is potent, and enduring." San.beck said, "This maudlin drama explores the loneliness of a woman who is successful in business but has only one relative she rarely sees. The world wars made for some quick marriages and many widows." NicksFlickPicks gave the film a rating of 3 stars out of 5. TV Guide said, "What might have been a trite soap opera is elevated to the status of superior emotional drama by a wise script, sensitive direction, and an Oscar-winning performance by de Havilland."

Awards and nominations

References

Further reading 
  Shadoian is a film scholar who wrote the monograph Dreams and Dead Ends: The American Gangster Film'' (1978, 2003).

External links 
 
 
 
 

1946 films
1946 romantic drama films
American black-and-white films
American romantic drama films
Films about adoption
Films directed by Mitchell Leisen
Films featuring a Best Actress Academy Award-winning performance
Films produced by Charles Brackett
Films scored by Victor Young
Films set in the 1910s
Films set in the 1920s
Films with screenplays by Charles Brackett
Paramount Pictures films
1940s English-language films
1940s American films